Ek Din Pratidin (English title: "And Quiet Rolls the Dawn") is a 1979 Bengali film directed by Mrinal Sen. The film stars Mamata Shankar, Gita Sen and Sreela Majumdar, among others. It was entered into the 1980 Cannes Film Festival.

Plot
The daughter of an economically middle-class family fails to return home one night. Her family worries, make searches and evolves into a deep crisis, more so because she is the only bread winner in the family. Overcoming the economic and social constraints, the film has a deep underlining of hidden strength.

Cast 
 Mamata Shankar as Chinu
 Gita Sen as Chinu's mother
 Sreela Majumdar as Minu
 Kaushik Sen
 Nalini Banerjee
 Arun Mukherjee 
 Umanath Bhattacharya
 Biplab Chatterjee
Satya Bandhyopadhyay

Awards 
National Film Award for Best Feature Film in Bengali
National Film Award for Best Direction
National Film Award for Best Editing-Gangadhar Naskar

References

External links

A review

1979 films
Films directed by Mrinal Sen
1979 drama films
Bengali-language Indian films
Films set in Kolkata
Films whose director won the Best Director National Film Award
Films whose editor won the Best Film Editing National Award
1970s Bengali-language films